Andrew Graham (born 20 June 1942) is a British political economist. He is currently Executive Chair of the Europaeum and Chair of the Academic Council of the Europaeum, Senior Fellow of the Oxford Internet Institute, Trustee of Reprieve, and an Honorary Fellow of Balliol College, Oxford and of St Edmund Hall, Oxford.

Early life
The son of the novelist Winston Graham, Andrew Graham was born in Perranporth, Cornwall, and attended Truro Cathedral School and then Charterhouse, Godalming, Surrey. He read Philosophy, Politics and Economics at St Edmund Hall, University of Oxford.

Career
On graduation, Andrew Graham joined the National Economic Development Office (1964) followed by the Department of Economic Affairs (1964–1966). From the DEA, he moved to No.10 as economic assistant to Thomas Balogh (1966–1967), then Economic Advisor to the Harold Wilson cabinet. In 1967, Andrew Graham became economic adviser to the Prime Minister (1967–1969) and from 1969 to 1997 he was Fellow and Tutor in Economics at Balliol College, Oxford.

In 1974, Andrew Graham returned to the No 10 Policy Unit as Policy Advisor to the Prime Minister, Harold Wilson (1974–1976). In 1988, he became chief economic advisor to the Shadow Chancellor of the Exchequer and later Leader of the Labour Party, John Smith MP. He held this position until Smith's death in 1994.

In 1997, he was appointed Acting Master of Balliol and subsequently elected as Master of Balliol (2001–2011). He was an elected member of the Oxford University Council (2006-2011).

In 2001, he raised £15 million and founded the Oxford Internet Institute – the first multidisciplinary research centre at a major university examining the effects on society of the Internet. In 2003, Oxford University awarded him an Honorary Doctorate of Civil Law. In 2010, he set up the Balliol Interdisciplinary Institute. During Andrew Graham's tenure as Master, Balliol substantially improved its overall finances, extended its fundraising, and in 2008 combined its students obtaining the most first class degrees in finals, with the men's rowing team competing in the Head of the River Race – a feat matched by the women's team in 2011. He stood down as Master of Balliol on 1 October 2011.

He was Acting Warden of Rhodes House (2012–2013) and a Rhodes Foundation Trustee (2013–2016). Other posts, include: member of the media advisory committee of the Institute for Public Policy Research (1994–97), Board Member Channel 4 Television (1998–2005), consultant to the BBC (1989–1992) writing extensively on the case for public service broadcasting, Trustee of the Esmee Fairbairn Foundation (2003–2005), Director of the Scott Trust (2005–2016) and, from 2014, he was consultant to Mammoth Screen for the BBC series, Poldark, based on his father's novel cycle. At the Europaeum he has led a major restructuring, including increasing the number of full member universities from eleven in 2016 to seventeen in 2019, raising the regular income by more than 70 percent and launching a Europaeum Scholarship Programme.

Personal

He is a passionate windsurfer. He is married to Peggotty.

References

External links

 A video broadcast by Graham reflecting on his time at Balliol

1942 births
Living people
People educated at Charterhouse School
Alumni of St Edmund Hall, Oxford
Fellows of Balliol College, Oxford
Masters of Balliol College, Oxford
English economists
People from Perranporth
People educated at Truro Cathedral School
Oxford University Press people